Aristotelis Panagiotidis (born 17 January 1997) is a Greek professional footballer who plays as a midfielder for AEP Karagiannia.

Club career
On August 12, 2016 it was announced that Panagiotidis signed a long year season contract with Panserraikos, on loan from PAOK.

References

External links

1997 births
Living people
Greek footballers
Association football midfielders
Super League Greece players
PAOK FC players
Panserraikos F.C. players
Kallithea F.C. players
Apollon Paralimnio F.C. players
Footballers from Ptolemaida